Naval Air Station (NAS) Oceana or NAS Oceana  is a United States Navy Naval Air Station located in Virginia Beach, Virginia.  

Nowadays, the station is located on 23.9 km2. It has total of 250 aircraft deployed and buildings valued at $800 million in plant replacement value. The total Navy community (which includes spouses) count for around 20.000 people. 

The base is under the jurisdiction of Navy Region Mid-Atlantic and is the headquarters of Strike Fighter Wing Atlantic and Carrier Air Wings 1, 3, 7 and 8. As home to all East Coast strike fighter jet squadrons, the Naval Air Station is classified as a master jet base.  

The airfield is known as Apollo Soucek Field, named after Lieutenant (later Admiral) Apollo Soucek, a Navy test pilot who set the global altitude record in 1930 by flying a Curtiss "Hawk" biplane to an altitude of 43,166 feet. 

Constructed in 1941, and officially commissioned in 1943, NAS Oceana has been home to carrier-based aircraft since its inception. The field serves as home for 14 deployable Strike Fighter squadrons operating the F/A-18E/F Super Hornet, a Strike Fighter Fleet Replacement Squadron, an adversary squadron, and a logistics squadron. Additionally, NAS Oceana operates Dam Neck Annex, a separate military installation that is home to other non-flying commands, including various school houses, and Naval Auxiliary Landing Field Fentress, a practice carrier landing field, in nearby Chesapeake, VA. The air station is not open to the public except one weekend each year, usually in September, when it hosts the NAS Oceana Air Show.

History
In November 1940, the U.S. Government acquired the land (around 1.1 km2) that would eventually become Naval Air Station Oceana. At that time, the surrounding area was mainly farmland susceptible to flooding, but it served as a useful outlying field for the rapidly expanding Naval Air Force centered at NAS Norfolk and allowed units to work up for deployments away from the crowded base there. At first the US Government constructed a small airfield with 32 officers and 172 enlisted man. In December 1940, began the construction of asphalt runways which were completed by November 1941.

In 1943, the United States Congress approved a project for the expansion of the station to allow for the deployment of up to 160 officers and 800 enlisted men, plus the construction of longer runways. At the same time, the station was changed to Naval Auxiliary Air Station. Airspace and airfield facility restrictions precluded NAS Norfolk from serving as the home station for tactical air units, and in the 1950s NAS Oceana was designated to the status of Master Jet Base to serve that purpose, being nominated Naval Air Station. 

NAS Oceana has grown to become one of the largest and most advanced air stations in the world, comprising 6,820 acres (including Dam Neck Annex). Obstruction clearances and flight easements total an additional . NAS Oceana's primary mission is to train and deploy the Navy's Atlantic Fleet strike fighter squadrons of F/A-18 Hornets and Super Hornets. Naval Aviators and Naval Flight Officers stationed at NAS Oceana fly approximately 219,000 training operations each year.

Under the Navy's Master Jet Base concept, all Type/Model/Series (T/M/S) aircraft were home-based at one field with associated intermediate maintenance and training facilities. In the 1960s, NAS Oceana became the home to all East Coast based F-4 Phantom II squadrons. Fighter Squadron 101 (VF-101) established a detachment at NAS Oceana in its role as the Fleet Readiness Squadron (FRS), formerly known as the Replacement Air Group or "RAG", that trained aircrews and maintainers to operate the Phantom (at the time, VF-101 operated out of NAS Key West, Florida). After the F-14 Tomcat arrived on the scene in 1976, VF-101 transitioned to Tomcat operations and Phantom training operations shifted to newly established Fighter Squadron 171 (VF-171) to handle Atlantic Fleet training for the F-4 Phantom until it was retired from service in 1984. The last F-14 was retired on 22 September 2006. At one time, in addition to fighter aircraft, all of the Atlantic Fleet's A-6 Intruder medium attack squadrons were also home-based at NAS Oceana, along with VA-42 as the associated Fleet Readiness Squadron charged with training all east coast A-6 pilots, bombardier/navigators and A-6 maintenance personnel.  The A-6E was retired from the Fleet in 1997.

Additionally, NAS Oceana became home to the F/A-18 Hornet in 1999 following the Navy's closure of NAS Cecil Field, Florida as part of the Base Realignment and Closure (BRAC) process.

Aside from its military function, NAS Oceana was an alternative landing site for NASA's Space Shuttle until the program ended in 2011.

On April 6, 2012 an F/A-18D assigned to VFA-106 took off from NAS Oceana, encountered dual engine failure and crashed into an apartment complex in Virginia Beach, Virginia. Both pilots ejected safely, and there were no fatalities.

Current operations 

Home to seventeen strike fighter squadrons of F/A-18 Hornets and F/A-18 Super Hornets, the base is the sole East Coast Master Jet Base and home to all the east coast strike-fighter (VFA) units (excluding VFA-86 and Marine Corps VMFA squadrons). Training is conducted by VFA-106 Gladiators in their F/A-18E/F Super Hornets.

Tomcat training was conducted by VF-101 Grim Reapers. NAS Oceana was host to the "Tomcat Sunset" reunion from 21–23 September 2006, where over 3000 former and current aircrew and maintainers came together to celebrate the retirement of the F-14 from active Fleet service.  NAS Oceana also was the location where the F-14 took off for the last time for final flight of the type when F-14D,  Bureau Number (BuNo) 164603, Modex 101, of Fighter Squadron 31 (VF-31) was ferried from NAS Oceana to Republic Airport in East Farmingdale on Long Island, NY for permanent static display at the Northrop Grumman facilities where the Tomcat was originally built.

During the 2005 round of BRAC base closures, it was decided that NAS Oceana could remain open only if certain conditions were met. The most contentious of these requirements was that the city of Virginia Beach buy and condemn approximately 3,400 residences and an unknown number of businesses in crash zones surrounding the base. The BRAC commission proposed moving the fighters to Cecil Field, a recently deactivated naval air station located near Jacksonville, Florida if NAS Oceana was not able to meet that and several other conditions.  The plan was initially met with optimism by Jacksonville Mayor John Peyton, even though Cecil Field had already been converted into a joint civil-military airport with helicopter operations by the U.S. Coast Guard and the Florida Army National Guard and an associated commerce park dominated by major aerospace firms such as Northrop Grumman and Boeing performing major maintenance and overhaul work on a variety of military jet aircraft.  The senior Navy leadership ultimately expressed disinterest in moving the Master Jet Base back to the Jacksonville area, having only deactivated Cecil Field less than six years earlier and moving all its Atlantic Fleet F/A-18 squadrons from the former NAS Cecil Field to NAS Oceana.  In October 2005, the city of Jacksonville removed itself from the process.

On 20 December 2005 the Virginia Beach City Council passed numerous ordinances enacted to satisfy BRAC, but did not act to condemn any of the homes in the designated areas. In a November 2006 referendum, citizens of Jacksonville voted to leave the Cecil Field Airport and Commerce Center in civilian hands under the Jacksonville Aviation Authority, effectively halting any future plans of relocation.

In addition to the squadrons listed, there are numerous other commands present as "tenant" commands at Oceana:
 Fleet Readiness Center Mid-Atlantic, formerly known as Aviation Intermediate Maintenance Department (AIMD) Oceana. One of six centers for naval aviation maintenance, FRC provides Intermediate and Depot level maintenance support to the tenant squadrons and SeaOpDet technicians to aircraft carriers home-ported on the East Coast.
 Strike Fighter Wing Atlantic, the command that serves as "Commodore" of all east coast Hornet and Super Hornet squadrons when not forward deployed with their respective carrier air wings.
 Strike Fighter Weapons School Atlantic (SFWSL) a Type Weapons School staffed by Strike Fighter Weapons & Tactics (SFWTI) instructors where F/A-18 aircrews go for "graduate level" training in air-to-ground ordnance delivery and air-to-air tactics.
 Landing Signal Officer School (LSO School), where pilots selected to be LSOs (also known as "paddles"...which is a very old term from the days when the LSO actually signaled to the approaching aircraft with brightly colored paddles) go to learn how to "wave" planes aboard the "boat" (aircrew speak for the aircraft carrier).
 CVW commands, or Carrier Air Wing Commanders (also called CAG, which is an old term derived from the previous name for these commands, Carrier Air Groups), which are responsible for all squadrons in an air wing when actually on board a carrier or when preparing for overseas deployment. Carrier Air Wings One, Three, Seven, and Eight        maintain headquarters at NAS Oceana.
 Strike Fighter Composite Squadron 12 (VFC-12), a Navy Reserve F/A-18A+ Hornet squadron that provides adversary/aggressor training services to Atlantic Fleet strike fighter squadrons.
 Fleet Logistics Support Squadron 56 (VR-56), a Navy Reserve C-40 squadron that provides worldwide operational support airlift for deployable U.S. Navy Fleet units and shore establishment commands.
 Fleet Area Control and Surveillance Facility Virginia Capes (FACSFAC VACAPES, call sign GIANT KILLER), which is responsible for surveillance, management and sea and air traffic control of the Virginia Capes warning areas for training purposes, as well as surveillance duties in support of Homeland Defense.
 Construction Battalion Unit 415 (CBU 415), a Navy Seabee Battalion.
 Center for Naval Aviation Technical Training Unit Oceana (CNATTU Oceana), which trains Navy and Marine Corps aircraft maintainers on the F/A-18 and operates both A and C schools.
 Marine Aviation Training Support Group 33, a United States Marine Corps training administration command, primarily supporting USMC aviation student and instructor staff personnel assigned to the F/A-18 Fleet Readiness Squadron, VFA-106.
 A branch Medical and Dental clinic under the command of Naval Medical Center Portsmouth, VA.

Outlying field controversy

Plans by the Navy to construct an Naval outlying landing field supporting both NAS Oceana and MCAS Cherry Point in eastern North Carolina, initiated in 2006, met with fierce opposition by local residents and environmentalists. Concerns about the ecological impacts of the field, along with noise concerns voiced by residents, led to the abandonment of the initially planned sites for the OLF, along with a delay in the project's environmental impact statement.

In early 2011, the U.S. Navy announced it was suspending plans for the construction of the outlying landing field until at least 2014.

Tenant Commands

Carrier Wings
Strike Fighter Wing Atlantic
 Carrier Air Wing 1 (CVW-1), assigned to: USS Harry S. Truman (CVN-75)
 Carrier Air Wing 3 (CVW-3), assigned to: USS Dwight D. Eisenhower (CVN-69)
 Carrier Air Wing 7 (CVW-7), assigned to: USS George H.W. Bush (CVN-77)
 Carrier Air Wing 8 (CVW-8), assigned to: USS Gerald R. Ford (CVN-78)

Squadrons

Notes:

Environment
In mid-May 2017,  of jet fuel spilled from a storage tank, and also spread onto adjoining properties and waterways, notably Wolfsnare Creek. The installation worked closely with local communities to assist with emergency relocation and issuing water. Fishermen were warned to refrain from fishing, crabbing and other recreational activities in the area. Affected wildlife was identified and helped as part of the cleanup.

See also
 Skytypers Air Show Team (fatal accident September 7, 2007)
List of United States Navy airfields

References

External links 

 
 
 

Military installations in Virginia
Oceana, Naval Air Station
Military airbases established in 1943
1943 establishments in Virginia
History of Virginia Beach, Virginia
Military in Virginia Beach, Virginia
Space Shuttle Emergency Landing Sites